Oxygnathopsis javana is a species of beetle in the family Carabidae, the only species in the genus Oxygnathopsis.

References

Scaritinae